WOW Hits 2011 is a two-disc compilation album composed of some of the biggest hits on Christian radio in 2010. Disc one features more AC radio hits, while disc two features the CHR/Rock radio hits.  The album was also issued in a deluxe version featuring six bonus remixes.

The album hit No. 1 on Billboard's Top Christian Albums chart in 2010, and peaked at No. 26 on the Billboard 200 chart.

Track listing

Note
Remixes are exclusive to this album.

Charts

Weekly charts

Year-end charts

References

External links
 WOW Hits official website

2010 compilation albums
2011